Jack Sock was the defending champion, but lost in the second round to Peter Gojowczyk.

Roberto Bautista Agut won the title, defeating Juan Martín del Potro in the final, 6–1, 4–6, 7–5.

Seeds
The top four seeds received a bye into the second round.

Draw

Finals

Top half

Bottom half

Qualifying

Seeds

Qualifiers

Lucky losers

Qualifying draw

First qualifier

Second qualifier

Third qualifier

Fourth qualifier

References
 Main Draw
 Qualifying Draw

2018 Singles
2018 ATP World Tour
2018 in New Zealand tennis